Giorgio Antonucci (24 February 1933 – 18 November 2017) was an Italian physician, known for his questioning of the basis of psychiatry.

Biography 

In 1963 Antonucci studied psychoanalysis with Roberto Assagioli, the founder of psychosynthesis, and began to dedicate himself to psychiatry trying to solve the problems of the patients and avoiding hospitalisation and any kind of coercive method (mechanical, pharmacological, psychological). In 1968 he worked in Cividale del Friuli with Edelweiss Cotti, in a ward of the city hospital that had been opened as an alternative to the mental hospitals -called Centro di Relazioni Umane [Centre for Human Relations].

In 1969 he worked at the psychiatric hospital of Gorizia, directed by Franco Basaglia. From 1970 to 1972 he directed the mental health centre of Castelnuovo nei Monti in the province of Reggio Emilia. From 1973 to 1996 he worked in Imola on the dismantling of several wards of the psychiatric hospitals Osservanza and Luigi Lolli under his direction. During the earthquake that struck Sicily in 1968 he worked as a physician for the Civil Protection Service of Florence. At the time of his death in 2017 Antonucci lived in Florence and collaborated with the Italian branch of the Citizens Commission on Human Rights, with the Centro di Relazioni Umane and with Radicali Italiani.

Thought on psychiatry 

In his writings, Antonucci affirmed that theoretically he is close to the humanistic-existential perspective of Carl Rogers, the approaches focused on the critique of psychiatry (Erving Goffman, R. D. Laing, David Cooper and Thomas Szasz) and the critique of the psychiatric institution of Franco Basaglia.

Szasz affirmed to agree with Antonucci on the concept of "person" of the so-called psychiatric patients: They are, like us, persons in all respects, that can be judged emotionally and in their "human condition"; "mental illness" does not make the patient "less than a man", and it is not necessary to appeal to a psychiatrist to "give them back humanity"
He is the founder of the non-psychiatric approach to psychological suffering, that is based on the following propositions:
 The involuntary commitment cannot be a scientific and medical approach to suffering, because it is based on violence against the patient's will.
 The ethic of the dialogue is substituted for the ethic of coercion. The dialogue cannot take place unless the individuals recognise themselves as persons in a confrontation among peers.
 The diagnosis is rejected as psychiatric prejudice that impedes to undertake the real psychological work on the suffering of people, due to the contradictions of nature and the conscience and because of the contradictions of society and the conflicts of living together.
 Psychoactive drugs aim to sedate, to drug the person in order to improve the living conditions of the people that look after the psychiatric patient. All the other instruments that damage the person are refused, from the lobotomy to the castration (proposed by some people also in Italy with reference to sexual offenses), and every type of shock.
 In order to criticize the institutions it is necessary to bring into question also the thought that created them.

Antonucci posited that the "essence of psychiatry lies in an ideology of discrimination". He defended a “non-psychiatric thought, which considers psychiatry as an ideology without scientific content, a non-knowledge, whose aim is to annihilate people instead of trying to understand the difficulties of life, both individual and social, in order to defend people, change society and give life to an authentically new culture.”

Giorgio Antonucci and Thomas Szasz 

In the words of Thomas Szasz, "Italian psychiatry has been incalculably enriched by Giorgio Antonucci. It is possible to consider him a good psychiatrist (whatever the meaning of the word): and that is true. It is also possible to consider him a good antipsychiatrist (whatever the meaning of the word): and that is just as certain. I prefer to consider him a respectable person that puts the respect for the so-called insane person above the respect for the profession. For that I send him my regards."

Awards 

On 26 February 2005 Antonucci received in Los Angeles the Thomas Szasz Award.

Works 
 I pregiudizi e la conoscenza critica alla psichiatria (preface by Thomas S. Szasz), ed. Coop. Apache - 1986
 Psichiatria ieri ed oggi, Enciclopedia Atlantica (European Book, Milano) - 1989
 Il pregiudizio psichiatrico, Eleuthera - 1989 
 La nave del paradiso, Spirali - 1990 
 Freud e la psichiatria, Enciclopedia Atlantica, European Book, Milano - 1990
 Aggressività Composizione in tre tempi in Uomini e lupi, Edizioni Eleuthera - 1990 
 Psichiatria e cultura, Enciclopedia Atlantica, European Book, Milano - 1991
 Contrappunti, Roma: Sensibili alle foglie - 1994 
 Critica al giudizio psichiatrico, Sensibili alle Foglie - 1994 
 Il giudice e lo psichiatra, collection Volontà di Eleuthera - volume - Delitto e castigo - 1994 
 (with Alessio Coppola) Il telefono viola. Contro i metodi della psichiatria, Eleuthera - 1995 
 Pensieri sul suicidio, Eleuthera - 1996 
 Il pregiudizio psichiatrico, Eleuthera - 1998 
 Le lezioni della mia vita. La medicina, la psichiatria, le istituzioni, Spirali - 1999 
 Pensieri sul suicidio, Eleuthera - 2002 
 Il cervello. Atti del congresso internazionale Milano, dal 29 novembre al 1º dicembre 2002 (it contains Antonucci's speech at the congress), Spirali - 2004
 Critica al giudizio psichiatrico, Sensibili alle Foglie - 2005 
 Diario dal manicomio. Ricordi e pensieri, Spirali - 2006 
 Igiene mentale e libero pensiero. Giudizio e pregiudizio psichiatrici, publication by the association "Umanità nova", Reggio Emilia - October 2007.
 Foucault e l'antipsichiatria. Intervista a Giorgio Antonucci."Diogene Filosofare Oggi" N. 10 - Anno 2008 - Con «IL DOSSIER: 30 anni dalla legge Basaglia»
 Corpo - "Intervista di Augusta Eniti a Giorgio Antonucci", Multiverso" Università degli studi di Udine, n.07 08 . 2008
 Conversazione con Giorgio Antonucci edited by Erveda Sansi. Critical Book - I quaderni dei saperi critici - Milano 16.04.2010. S.p.A. Leoncavallo.
 (with other authors) La libertà sospesa, Fefè editore, Roma - 2012 
 (contributions by Giorgio Antonucci and Ruggero Chinaglia) Della Mediazione by Elisa Ruggiero, Aracne - 2013 
 El prejuicio psiquiátrico [Il pregiudizio psichiatrico], introductions by Thomas Szasz and Massimo Paolini, translation and editorial coordination by Massimo Paolini, Katakrak, Pamplona, 2018 - 
 Il pregiudizio psichiatrico, with a preface by Thomas Szasz, Ed. Elèuthera, 2020,

Bibliography 
 Dossier Imola e legge 180, Alberto Bonetti, Dacia Maraini, Giuseppe Favati, Gianni Tadolini, Idea books - Milano 1979.
 Antipsykiatri eller Ikke - Psykiatri, Svend Bach, Edizioni Amalie Copenaghen - 1989
 Atlanti della filosofia. Il pensiero anarchico. Alle radici della libertà. Edizioni Demetra - Colognola ai Colli. Verona - December 1997. .
 Sanità obbligata, Claudia Benatti, preface by Alex Zanotelli, Macro Edizioni, Diegaro di Cesena - October 2004. 
 Le urla dal silenzio. La paura e i suoi linguaggi, Chiara Gazzola, Interviste, Aliberti Editore, Reggio Emilia - 2006. 
 Il 68 visto dal basso. Esercizi di memoria il '68, Giuseppe Gozzini, Asterios editore Trieste - November 2008. 
 Dentro Fuori: testimonianze di ex-infermieri degli ospedali psichiatrici di Imola, edited by Roberta Giacometti, Bacchilega Editori - 2009. 
 La parola fine. Diario di un suicidio, Roberta Tatafiore, Rizzoli - April 2010.
 La mia mano destra, Donato Salvia, Bonfirraro Editore, Barrafranca-Enna - May 2011 
 La grande festa, Dacia Maraini, Rizzoli - November 2011 - 
 L'inganno psichiatrico, Roberto Cestari, Libres s.r.l. Casa Editrice, Milano - May 2012 
 Che cos'è l'Antipsichiatria? - Storia della nascita del movimento di critica alla psichiatria, Francesco Codato Ed. Psiconline, October 2013, 
 La Repubblica dei matti, John Foot, Ed. Feltrinelli, November 2014. 
 Encyclopedia of Theory and Practice in Psychotherapy and Counseling, José A. Fadul, Lulu Press Inc., London, 
 The Man Who Closed the Asylums: Franco Basaglia and the Revolution in Mental Health Care, John Foot, Verso Books, New York, 2015, 
 Le radici culturali della diagnosi, Pietro Barbetta, Meltemi Editore srl, 2003, 
 La chiave comune. Esperienze di lavoro presso l'ospedale psichiatrico Luigi Lolli di Imola, Giovanni Angioli, ED. La Mandragola Editrice, 11/2016. 
 Forse non sarà domani: Invenzioni a due voci su Luigi Tenco, Mario Campanella, Gaspare Palmieri, LIT EDIZIONI, 2017, 
 Giorgio Antonucci: una vida por la liberación de quienes no tienen poder, Massimo Paolini, El Salto, 1 December 2017
 Giorgio Antonucci: a life for the liberation of the powerless, Massimo Paolini, Open Democracy, 6 December 2017
 Recomponer la imagen, cuestionando el poder [preface to the book ‘El prejuicio psiquiátrico’], Massimo Paolini, Perspectivas anómalas | ciudad · arquitectura · ideas, 2018
 Críticas y alternativas en psiquiatría, Rafael Huertas et al., Los Libros de la Catarata, 2018, 
 Conversación entre Guillermo Vera y Massimo Paolini acerca de la publicación del libro El prejuicio psiquiátrico in Perspectivas anómalas | ciudad · arquitectura · ideas, 2019
 Welcome to Arkham Asylum: Essays on Psychiatry and the Gotham City Institution, Sharon Packer, M.D., Daniel R. Fredrick, McFarland, 2019
 The Italian Psychiatric Experience, Alessandro De Risio, Cambridge Scholars Publishing, 2019
 Critical Neuroscience and Philosophy: A Scientific Re-Examination of the Mind-Body Problem, David Låg Tomasi, Springer Nature, 2020
 Madness in Contemporary British Theatre. Resistances and Representations, Jon Venn, Springer, 2021,

References

Interviews 
 Periódico Diagonal nº 250: Antonucci: La locura no tiene ningún significado filosófico, interview to Giorgio Antonucci by Massimo Paolini (see 'External links'). The interview has been republished in CTXT nº 28, Infolibre and Viento Sur.
 Psichiatria e potere, interview to Giorgio Antonucci by Moreno Paulon, in «A Rivista Anarchica», 46, No. 408, June 2016.

External links 
 Premio Giorgio Antonucci
 Giorgio Antonucci interviewed on Vimeo (Italian)
 Giorgio Antonucci speaks about Franco Basaglia (Italian)
 Giorgio Antonucci speaks about psychiatry (Italian)
 Giorgio Antonucci on ADHD (Italian)
 Interview to Giorgio Antonucci (Italian)
 Giorgio Antonucci speaks about Thomas Szasz (Italian)
 Giorgio Antonucci. Il pregiudizio psichiatrico | Full text of the book (Italian)
 Gli occhi non li vedono (English subtitles)
 Giorgio Antonucci interviewed on Periódico Diagonal and Perspectivas anómalas | ciudad · arquitectura · ideas (Spanish)
 The Man Who Closed the Asylums: Franco Basaglia and the Revolution in Mental Health Care, review by Dr Peter Barham, Wellcome Unit for the History of Medicine, University of Oxford
 UK Parliament, Memorandum from the Citizens Commission on Human Rights (DMH 291)
 Università La Sapienza, Rome, Interview to Giorgio Antonucci (audio, Italian)

1933 births
2017 deaths
Italian psychiatrists
People from Lucca
Anti-psychiatry
Italian libertarians
Italian humanists
Deinstitutionalisation in Italy
Theorists in psychiatry
Psychiatry academics
Italian writers
Italian poets